Badayuni or Badauni is an Indian toponymic surname (nisba) for people from Budaun (formerly Badayun and Badaun) in Uttar Pradesh, India. People with this name include:

 `Abd al-Qadir Bada'uni (c. 1540 – c. 1605), Grand Mufti of India during the Mughal era
 Abdul Hamid Qadri Badayuni (1898–1970), Pakistani scholar
 Ada Jafri or Ada Badayuni (1924–2015), Pakistani Urdu poet ad writer
 Shakeel Badayuni (1916–1970), Indian poet and lyricist
 Bekhud Badayuni (1857–1912), Indian Urdu poet
 Fani Badayuni (1879–1961), Indian Urdu poet
 Zamir Ali Badayuni (1941–2003), Pakistani writer and broadcaster

Surnames
Indian surnames
Surnames of Indian origin
Toponymic surnames
Urdu-language surnames
People from Budaun
Nisbas